Christoph Alexander Klefenz (born 1986) is a Welsh international lawn and indoor bowler.

Bowls career
In 2017, he won a gold medal at the European Bowls Championships. The following year in 2018, he was a member of the fours team that won the Welsh National Bowls Championships. He made his senior international debut in 2019 when selected to play in the Atlantic Championships.

In 2020, he was selected for the 2020 World Outdoor Bowls Championship in Australia. In 2022, Klefenz won his second national title, winning the pairs with Danny Davies Jr. bowling for the Beaufort Club.

References

Welsh male bowls players
Living people
1986 births
Bowls European Champions